Dresvyanka is a rural locality (a village) in Shelotskoye Rural Settlement, Verkhovazhsky District, Vologda Oblast, Russia. The population was 19 as of 2002.

Geography 
The distance to Verkhovazhye is 71.8 km, to Shelota is 2.3 km. Fofanovskaya, Shelota, Bolshoye Pogorelovo, Maloye Pogorelovo, Stepanovo, Tatarinskaya is the nearest rural locality.

References 

Rural localities in Verkhovazhsky District